Eric Brewer may refer to:

 Eric Brewer (ice hockey) (born 1979), Canadian ice hockey player
 Eric Brewer (scientist), American computer scientist